The 1992–93 Marquette Warriors men's basketball team represented the Marquette University in the 1992–93 season. The Warriors finished the regular season with a record of 20–8, 6—5. They received the conference's automatic bid to the NCAA Tournament where they lost in the first round to Oklahoma State.

Roster

Schedule

External links
MUScoop's MUWiki

References 

Marquette
Marquette
Marquette Golden Eagles men's basketball seasons
Marquette
Marquette